Gandharpale Caves, also called Mahad caves is group of 30 Buddhist caves, 105 km south of Mumbai on Mumbai-Goa Highway near Mahad. The caves are located near the NH-17 and well connected by road.

Important cave include:
Cave 1: has Verandah in front 53 feet long and 8 feet wide. Shrine has sculpture images of Buddha, with wheel and deer beneath
Cave 8: it has high dogoba
Cave 15: has dogoba 
Cave 21: seated Buddha with attendants

The inscription describes donations by bankers, and the gift of a farm to the Sangha.

References

Buddhist caves in India
Caves of Maharashtra
Indian rock-cut architecture
Former populated places in India
Buddhist pilgrimage sites in India
Caves containing pictograms in India
Buddhist monasteries in India